Minnesota Bound is a television series that explores the outdoors and activities in Minnesota. It has been produced since 1995, and is broadcast weekly on KARE, KTTC, KVLY, and KBJR.  From 1995-2018 the show starred Ron Schara and his dog, Raven, a Black Labrador Retriever. The show had broadcast 1,000 episodes by 2021. There were three Ravens over the course of Ron's tenure: Raven I (1995-2005), Raven II (2005–07), Raven III (born July 2006, Debuted January 2007, died March 2020).

Minnesota Bound is also a weekly story segment on Kare 11 News, also starring Ron Schara.

External links 
 Official Site

References

Television in Minnesota
1995 American television series debuts